Li Baodong (born April 1955) is a Chinese diplomat who served as the Permanent Representative of the People's Republic of China to the United Nations from 2010 to 2013. He was later succeeded by Liu Jieyi.

Biography 
Li was born in April 1955 and is a native of Beijing. He completed his studies at the Beijing Foreign Studies University and  Johns Hopkins University. After graduating from university, Li entered diplomatic service and assumed various posts in the Ministry of Foreign Affairs. From 2005 to 2007, he served as Ambassador to Zambia. In 2007, Li was appointed as Permanent Representative of the People's Republic of China to the United Nations Office at Geneva and Other International Organizations in Switzerland. In 2010, he was appointed China's Permanent Representative to the United Nations replacing Zhang Yesui. During the months of March 2011 and June 2012, Li was the President of the United Nations Security Council. He is married and has a son.

See also
 Chinese in New York City

References 

Permanent Representatives of the People's Republic of China to the United Nations
1955 births
Living people
Ambassadors of China to Zambia
Chinese Communist Party politicians from Beijing
Beijing Foreign Studies University alumni
Johns Hopkins University alumni
Diplomats of the People's Republic of China
People's Republic of China politicians from Beijing